Francis Sherman constructed the Odd Fellows Hall on Vashon Island, Washington in 1912 with labor and materials donated by members of the Lodge. The building, which faces Vashon Highway, features a welcoming full-width front porch. In 1927, the lodge expanded the hall by adding single-story wings. The original, gable-roofed portion of the hall constitutes the center section of the present building. In conjunction with the women's chapter of the I.O.O.F. (Rebekah Lodge #277), the Odd Fellows hosted holiday celebrations, social events, and theatrical performances.

It was designated a King County and/or local landmark in 1985

References

Landmarks in King County, Washington
Odd Fellows buildings in Washington (state)
Buildings and structures in King County, Washington